Antonio Quarracino (8 August 1923 – 28 February 1998) was a Cardinal of the Catholic Church of Argentina and the Archbishop of Buenos Aires between 1990 and 1998.

Biography

Early life and priesthood

Quarracino was born in Pollica, Province of Salerno, Italy.  His family emigrated to Argentina when he was 4 years old, settling in the town of San Andrés de Giles in the province of Buenos Aires.

Quarracino was ordained priest on 22 December 1945, and became a professor at the diocesan seminary of Mercedes. He also taught theology at the Universidad Católica Argentina.

Episcopate and cardinalate
Quarracino was appointed Bishop of Nueve de Julio, Buenos Aires, by Pope John XXIII, on 3 February 1962, and received the episcopal see on 8 April of the same year. He participated in all sessions of the Second Vatican Council (1962–1965). On 3 August 1968 Paul VI moved him to the diocese of Avellaneda (whose new cathedral was built during his rule).

John Paul II promoted him to the Archdiocese of La Plata on 18 December 1985, and then on 10 July 1990 to the Archdiocese of Buenos Aires, a see to which is attached the title of Primate of Argentina. He was elected to preside over the Argentine Episcopal Conference in the following November, and then reelected until 1996. He was elevated to Cardinal-Priest of S. Maria della Salute a Primavalle in consistory on 28 June 1991.

On 27 June 1992 he was the principal consecrator of Jorge Mario Bergoglio, S.J., later Pope Francis, as bishop.

Death
Quarracino died in 1998 at the age of 74 at the Otamendi Hospital, due to a cardiac arrest. His doctors announced that his death came due to complications following intestinal surgery on 21 February 1998. He was succeeded automatically by his coadjutor bishop, the Jesuit Jorge Mario Bergoglio.

Views

Inter-religious dialogue with Jews
Quarracino was a major figure of inter-religious discussion with Jews. During a visit to Israel in 1992 he was decorated by Jewish institutions for this cause, and in 1997 he had a mural painting set up in the Cathedral of Buenos Aires commemorating the victims of the Holocaust and the bombings of the Israeli Embassy and the AMIA.

Social communications
Quarracino was inclined to journalism and, while in La Plata, he renewed the informative magazine of the archdiocese, transforming it into a full-fledged cultural publication. As Bishop of Buenos Aires, he appeared on TV regularly; he was in charge of a segment in a religious program (Claves para un mundo mejor) in the state-owned channel ATC.

Dirty War
Quarracino was outspoken about controversial topics. One of his first notable public statements was his support, in 1982, of a project of law that would end all investigation of the crimes of the Dirty War, in order to "contribute to national reconciliation". This can be seen as a precedent of the Ley de Punto Final, sanctioned in 1986.

Divorce
In 1990, Quarracino attracted controversy after criticizing a recently approved divorce law, saying that it had been the work of "Masonic influences" and that it also severely "weakened the Argentine people's traditional religious spirit".

Argentine politics
Quarracino was opposed to the policies of president Raúl Alfonsín (1983–1989) and accused politicians of corruption, as the cause of "national poverty". However, he acknowledged being a friend of president Carlos Menem (1989–1999) who was heavily criticized by other Church leaders (such as Cardinal Primatesta).

Homosexuality
In 1994, during his TV segment in ATC, Quarracino spoke against homosexuality saying that lesbians and gay men should be "locked up in a ghetto". This caused an accusation of discrimination, which was not considered by justice because anti-discrimination Law 23592 did not cover sexual orientation. Three years before he had termed homosexuality "a deviation of human nature, like bestiality".

Boca Juniors
The Cardinal was an avowed fan of the Boca Juniors football team. When he celebrated his 50 years of priesthood he received a Boca Juniors shirt signed by all the team members.

References

External links
 Catholic-Hierarchy.org
 Zenit Catholic News Agency
 Hoy magazine, La Plata, 1 March 1998.
 

1923 births
1998 deaths
People from the Province of Salerno
Argentine cardinals
Participants in the Second Vatican Council
Roman Catholic archbishops of Buenos Aires
20th-century Roman Catholic archbishops in Argentina
Cardinals created by Pope John Paul II
Italian emigrants to Argentina
Burials at Buenos Aires Metropolitan Cathedral
Roman Catholic bishops of Avellaneda-Lanús
Roman Catholic bishops of Nueve de Julio